The third Handsworth riot occurred on 2 September 1991 in Handsworth, an inner-city area of Birmingham, when a power cut plunged the area into darkness and sparked a looting spree in local shops. 200 police officers in riot gear were called in to bring the unrest under control. Hundreds of shops and houses were looted and cars were stolen. This occurred around the same time as rioting in Oxford, Dudley, Tyneside and Cardiff.

This was the third time in a decade that Handsworth had been the scene of major rioting, following a riot in 1981 and the worst wave of rioting in 1985, in which two people were killed. A fourth riot took place 14 years later.

See also
1981 Handsworth riots
1985 Handsworth riots
2005 Birmingham riots

References

1991 in England
1991 riots
Crime in Birmingham, West Midlands
History of Birmingham, West Midlands
Riots and civil disorder in England
1990s in Birmingham, West Midlands
September 1991 events in the United Kingdom